Rəsullu is a village in the municipality of Qabaqtəpə in the Dashkasan Rayon of Azerbaijan.

References

Populated places in Dashkasan District